The Elective Governor Acts of 1968 are a pair of acts passed by the 90th United States Congress in 1968, which provide for the Governor of the U.S. Virgin Islands and the Governor of Guam to be popularly elected, rather than appointed as they had been up to that point. The two acts are individually titled the Virgin Islands Elective Governor Act (Pub.L. 90-496, 82 Stat. 837, passed 23 August 1968) and the Guam Elective Governor Act (Pub.L. 90-497, 82 Stat. 842, passed 1 September 1968). The impetus for the acts came from extensive lobbying efforts by both Guamanians and Virgin Islanders. The Guam Legislature, led by Speaker Antonio Borja Won Pat, had begun lobbying Congress for popular elections in 1962. In the Virgin Islands, the act stemmed from the recommendations of the territory's first Constitutional Convention in 1964–5, which included the popular election of the governor. The acts were seen as a breakthrough for political reform both in Guam and the Virgin Islands. The Guam act was controversial, however, for authorizing federal auditing of the territory's accounts by the Interior Department—a practice that remained in place .

See also
 Guam Organic Act of 1950
 Revised Organic Act of the Virgin Islands

References

External links

 Elective Governor Act 1968 at Guampedia

1968 in American law
90th United States Congress
United States federal territory and statehood legislation
1968 in the United States Virgin Islands
1968 in Guam